Appeal to the People or An Appeal to the People was a document written by communists in Shōwa era Imperial Japan in Fuchu Prison. It was issued after their release on October 10, 1945, a month after the Surrender of Japan on September 2, 1945.

In the first issue of the Shimbun Akahata newspaper published after World War II, Kyuichi Tokuda, Yoshio Shiga, and other released Communists issued an "Appeal to the People" on October 10, 1945. In it the following themes were advanced:

According to John W. Dower "Later, when the Cold War intensified, this would become a point of embarrassment to the Communists, who lamely rationalized Tokuda's words by pointing out that the reference to "Allies" included the Soviet Union.

References

1945 in Japan
1945 documents
Communism in Japan
Japanese Communist Party
Manifestos
Prison writings
Republicanism in Japan
Shōwa period